Paul Henry Overton (born 18 April 1961) is a former English footballer who played as a goalkeeper in the Football League for Ipswich Town.

Career
Overton began his career in the youth set-up at Ipswich Town. On 28 April 1978, Overton made his debut for Ipswich in a 6–1 defeat away to Aston Villa, a week before Ipswich's FA Cup final victory against Arsenal. Overton's inclusion in the starting XI came after first choice goalkeeper Paul Cooper failed a fitness test due to a back injury, not wanting to risk aggravating it before Ipswich's maiden FA Cup final appearance. Ipswich manager Bobby Robson singled out Overton as the best player in Ipswich's 6–1 defeat. Following his departure from Ipswich in 1979, Overton joined Peterborough United and Northampton Town for a season each.

Overton later dropped down into Non-League football, playing for Histon, Cambridge United, Chatteris Town and hometown club Soham Town Rangers in the Eastern Counties League. Overton later managed Soham's reserves, before leaving the role in 2010.

References

1961 births
Living people
People from Soham
Association football goalkeepers
English footballers
Ipswich Town F.C. players
Peterborough United F.C. players
Northampton Town F.C. players
Histon F.C. players
Cambridge United F.C. players
Chatteris Town F.C. players
Soham Town Rangers F.C. players
English Football League players
English football managers